Neuschloss (Neuschloß), German for 'new castle', can refer to:

 Germany
 Neuschloss (Lampertheim), a community in the town of Lampertheim, Germany

 Estonia
 Vasknarva

 Poland
 Nowy Zamek

 Czech Republic
 Nové Hrady (Ústí nad Orlicí District), a village in the Czech Republic

 Romania
 Gherla, a city in Romania

 United Kingdom
 NEUSCHLOSS (art collective) a curatorial art collective that operates from Northumbria University, Newcastle.

See also 
 Neuburg (disambiguation)
 Nové Hrady (disambiguation)